Way Forward may refer to:

Conservative Way Forward, a British campaigning group within the Conservative Party
The Way Forward, Ford Motor Company's restructuring plan made public in 2006
WayForward, an American video game development company

See also
 New Way Forward (disambiguation)